Jangali (also Romanized as Jangalī) is a village in Chah Dadkhoda Rural District, Chah Dadkhoda District, Qaleh Ganj County, Kerman Province, Iran. At the 2006 census, its population was 214, in 50 families.

References 

Populated places in Qaleh Ganj County